Beer is the most popular alcoholic drink in New Zealand, accounting for 63% of available alcohol for sale. At around 64.7 litres per person per annum, New Zealand is ranked 27th in global beer consumption per capita. The vast majority of beer produced in New Zealand is a type of lager, either pale or amber in colour, and typically 4–5% alcohol by volume.

Although the two largest breweries in New Zealand, Lion Nathan and DB Breweries, control almost 90% of sales by volume between them, there are over 150 smaller craft breweries and brewpubs producing a vast range of beer styles, including many ales.

History
There is no oral tradition or archaeological evidence of the indigenous people of New Zealand (Māori) brewing beer before the arrival of Europeans and major ingredients of beer were not introduced to New Zealand until Europeans arrived in the late 18th century.

Captain Cook was the first to brew beer in New Zealand, on Resolution Island while anchored in Dusky Sound, Fiordland. He experimented with the use of young rimu branches and leaves as a treatment against scurvy, plus wort, molasses and leaves of the mānuka (tea tree). It was brewed on Saturday 27 March 1773 

The first commercial brewery in New Zealand was established in 1835 by Joel Samuel Polack in Kororareka (now Russell) in the Bay of Islands. During the 19th century, the brewing methods of Great Britain and Ireland were introduced to New Zealand, being the countries from which the vast majority of immigrants originated during that time – thus the dominant beer styles would have been ales, porters and stouts.

20th century
During the late 19th and early 20th century, the temperance movement in New Zealand had become a powerful and popular lobby group, as in the UK and the US. In 1919 at a national referendum poll, prohibition gained 49% of the vote and was only defeated when the votes of returned servicemen were counted. However, one aspect of wartime regulation was made permanent: a 6 pm closing time for licensed premises. This created the culture of the six o'clock swill, a law that was not repealed until 1967, and was to have an influence on the styles of beer brewed and drunk in New Zealand.

In the 1930s, the New Zealander Morton Coutts invented the continuous fermentation process. Gradually, beer production in New Zealand shifted from ales to lagers, using continuous fermentation. The style of beer made by this method has become known as New Zealand Draught, and became the most popular beer during the period of 6 pm closing.

During the same period, there was a gradual consolidation of breweries, such that by the 1970s virtually all brewing concerns in New Zealand were owned by either Lion Breweries or Dominion Breweries. Later, in the 1980s, small boutique or microbreweries started to emerge, and consequently the range of beer styles being brewed increased. The earliest was Mac's Brewery, started in 1981 in Nelson. Some pubs operated their own small breweries, often housed within the pub itself.

21st century

In recent years, pale and amber lager, the largest alcoholic drinks sector in terms of volume sales, have been on a downward trend as a result of a declining demand for standard and economy products. Conversely, ale production in New Zealand is primarily undertaken by small independent breweries and brewpubs, the Shakespeare Brewery in Auckland city being the first opened in 1986 for the 'craft' or 'premium' sector of the beer market. In 2010, this 'craft/premium' sector grew by 11%, to around 8% of the total beer market. This has been in a declining beer market, where availability of beer has dropped 7% by volume in the two previous years.

With a growth rate of 25% per year, craft beer and microbreweries were blamed for a 15 million litre drop in alcohol sales overall in 2012, with Kiwis opting for higher-priced premium beers over cheaper brands. The craft beer market in New Zealand is varied and progressive, with a full range of ale and lager styles of beer being brewed. New Zealand is fortunate in that it lies in the ideal latitude for barley and hops cultivation. A breeding programme had developed new hop varieties unique to New Zealand, many of these new hops have become mainstays in New Zealand craft beer.

Given the small market and relative high number of breweries, many breweries have spare capacity. A recent trend has seen the rise of contract brewing, where a brewing company contracts to use space in existing breweries to bring the beer to the market. Examples of contract brewers include Epic Brewing Company, Funk Estate and Yeastie Boys.

Over 2011 and 2012, New Zealand faced a shortage of hops, which affected several brewers countrywide. The shortage was primarily caused by a hop shortage in North America. Brewers Guild president Ralph Bungard noted that Americans were scrambling to get their hands on Kiwi hops as they were becoming more trendy in the American micro-brew market. One specialty brewery, Tuatara Brewery had just commenced production of an American Pale Ale—when the American hop shortage arose, they then created an Aotearoa Pale Ale, with New Zealand hops.

Styles

The most widely recognised style of beer to have originated in the country is New Zealand Draught. This is generally a malty, lightly hopped amber lager with 4–5% alcohol by volume. Martyn Cornell, the British beer writer, has suggested that New Zealand Draught is partly an evolution of the late 19th century mild ale, which was popular with the British working classes, many of whom emigrated to New Zealand. However, the beer is usually brewed using the continuous fermentation process and a lager yeast. During the latter period of the six o'clock swill, the beer was dispensed from kegs directly into customer's beer jugs using a hose and tap.

Much of the original ale lineage lingers on in the branding of nearly all New Zealand Draught beer, e.g. Speights Gold Medal Ale. In addition to this, the New Zealand Consumers' Institute criticised Tui for claiming to be an "East India Pale Ale" when it is in fact an amber lager that bears no resemblance to the traditionally hoppy, bitter India Pale Ale style.

Breweries

Large breweries
 Lion Breweries (owned by the Japanese company Kirin)
 Speight's Brewery
 Emerson Brewing Company
 Panhead Custom Ales
 Mac's
 DB Breweries (owned by Heineken, based in The Netherlands)
 Monteith's Brewing Company
 Tuatara Brewing
 Independent Breweries Ltd (owned by the Japanese company Asahi)

In addition, some international brands are brewed under licence in New Zealand. Some examples are Heineken, Amstel, and Tiger (DB Breweries); Kingfisher, Carlsberg, Holsten, and Tuborg (Boundary Road); and Kilkenny, Corona, Budweiser, Guinness, Stella Artois, and Beck's (Lion Nathan).

Microbreweries, nanobreweries and contract brewers

The following list contains some of the notable craft breweries of New Zealand. There are numerous other small breweries and brands.

Brewpubs
 Dux de Lux, Christchurch
 Fork & Brewer, Wellington – Champion Small Brewery of NZ 2018

See also

 Beer and breweries by region

References

External links

News and regular updates about New Zealand beers
Brewers Guild of New Zealand
Society Of Beer Advocates
NZ Craft Beer TV